Good Will Evil is a 2008 Taiwanese horror film directed by Lin Yu-fen and Wang Ming-chan, starring Terri Kwan, Tammy Chen, Leon Dai, Lu Yi-ching, Cindy Chi and Chen Wen-cheng. It was released on November 7, 2008 in Taiwan.

Plot
Tseng Wen-cheng, a successful young politician, wants to start a family. His wife, Yi-hsi, opposes his decision because she feels that she cannot accept the responsibility of motherhood. He manages to convince her to adopt Tien, an orphaned girl whose background is unclear. Tien behaves strangely and hardly speaks, except to a doll she carries with her all the time. On one occasion, the couple's housekeeper throws away the doll after it causes the washing machine to be jammed. She is attacked by a supernatural force and ends up in hospital. In another incident in school, two boys try to bully Tien but the teacher, Ms Chung, finds the bullies tied up together by red strings. The horrified bullies claim that Tien's doll was the one who tied them up. Ms Chung's mother, a spiritualist, uses her ability to contact the supernatural to find out about Tien's background. Tien came from a broken family and her elder brother, You, was the only one who cared about her. After You died in a fire, his spirit possessed the doll and remained with his sister to protect her.

Cast

External links
 

2008 horror films
2008 films
Taiwanese horror films